Pehlwan Goth is a neighborhood in the Karachi East district of Karachi, Pakistan. It was previously administered as part of the Gulshan Town borough, which was disbanded in 2011.

There are several ethnic groups in Pehlwan Goth including  Sindhis as majority, Muhajirs, Punjabis, Kashmiris, Seraikis, Pakhtuns, Balochis, etc. Over 95% of the population is Muslim; among other religious believers, Christians comprise around 5% of the total population. The population of Gulshan Town is estimated to be nearly one million.

See also
 Sindh Baloch Society
 Gulistan-e-Jauhar

References

External links 
 Karachi Website.

Neighbourhoods of Karachi
Gulshan Town